Rafael Urdaneta University; URU (Spanish: Universidad Rafael Urdaneta) is a private, non-profit university founded in 1973, located at La Vereda del Lago (Maracaibo, Venezuela), by the Rafael Urdaneta foundation and the Rafael Urdaneta university civic association. It receives its name from the general Rafael Urdaneta, Zulian father of Venezuelan independence.

Rafael Urdaneta University is a higher education institute whose purpose is to generate and apply the imparted knowledge to contribute to the evolution of the human being and to the formation of professionals with values, independent, competitive and compromised to the scientific, technical and humanistic development of the social environment to elaborate sustainable projects that resolve the problems of the State and the Nation.

History 

The Rafael Urdaneta University (URU) is a nonprofit institution, officially authorized by the Executive Order #101 of May 21, 1974, issued from the Presidency of the Republic, with a positive opinion of the National Council of Universities. It was created "with the purpose to form the necessary and capable human resource to face the scientific and technological developments" in the strategic areas of the country. It was founded by Eloy Parraga Villamarín, who used to be the Governor of Zulia state and ambassador of the United States of America.

Formed by extensive professional and business sectors of the society on October 24, 1973, it started educational activities on September 4, 1976. The Rafael Urdaneta University is named after the Zulian hero Rafael Urdaneta (1788-1845), a prominent leader of the Ibero-American independence.

Since its foundation, URU investigated and applied an anthropocentric role.  Given its commitment to education in a developing country, the university focuses on the Undergraduate education. It is an autonomous institution in the terms defined by the Constitution and the Law of Universities. Within the academic community, it is known for its respectful pluralism founded in logical reasoning; the methodology of the science and the social relevance of the knowledge incite the production of wisdom. The integral conception of the person is assumed in extra-curricular activities.

Mission 

Rafael Urdaneta University is a higher education institute whose purpose is to generate and apply the imparted knowledge to contribute to the evolution of the human being and to the formation of professionals with values, independent, competitive and compromised to the scientific, technical and humanistic development of the social environment to elaborate sustainable projects that resolve the problems of the State and the Nation.

In that sense, URU executes the necessary academic programs to form professionals of higher education in relevant areas from the social scientific point of view, through fresh and flexible curriculums which are constantly adapted to the new demands of the diverse disciplines of knowledge and of the professional praxis.

For that purpose, URU has programs of basic, applied, and extensive investigation.  From a higher level, through a line of heuristic training which defines the profile of the creative and suitable professional to resolve problems in situations of increasing complexity; URU emphasizes quaternary education through significative supports to the scientific and social context.

Faculties and schools 
The faculties and schools of URU are:

Faculty of Agricultural Sciences 
School of Animal Production Engineering

Faculty of Political, Management and Social Sciences 

School of Business Management
School of Public Accounting
School of Political Sciences
School of Law
School of Psychology

Faculty of Engineering and Architecture 
School of Civil Engineering
School of Electrical Engineering
School of Telecommunications Engineering
School of Chemical Engineering
School of Industrial Engineering
School of Computer Engineering
School of Architecture

References

Universities in Venezuela
Buildings and structures in Maracaibo
Educational institutions established in 1973
1973 establishments in Venezuela